DWAW may refer to:

 DWAW-AM, a defunct AM radio station broadcasting in Batangas
 DWAW-FM, an FM radio station broadcasting in Sorsogon City, branded as 99.9 Wow Smile Radio
 DWAW-TV, a defunct TV station broadcasting in Sorsogon City, branded as ABS-CBN